Yvan Rodic, also known as FaceHunter, is a Swiss fashion photographer, blogger and digital nomad. He travels the world photographing people at cultural and fashion events. He began a blog in 2006, and has since contributed to brands such as Armani, Esprit, and Volvo, among others. He was called "The King of street style photography" by CNN.

Rodic has published four books with Thames & Hudson: FaceHunter (2010), A Year in The Life of FaceHunter (2013), Travels with Facehunter (2013), and Street Chic (2009),.

Books

References

External links
Yvan Rodic Visual Diary

1977 births
Living people
Swiss photographers
People from Vevey